Beloceratidae is a family of ammonites included in the order Ceratitida.

These fast-moving nektonic carnivores lived in the Late Devonian period, from 379.5 to 376.1 Ma.

Genera
Beloceras Hyatt 1884
Eobeloceras Schindewolf 1936
Mesobeloceras Glenister 1958
Naplesites Yatskov 1990

Distribution
Fossils of species within this genus have been found in the Devonian sediments of Algeria, France, Germany, Morocco, Spain and United States.

References

Ceratitida families
Late Devonian life
Devonian molluscs